Laos, officially the Lao People's Democratic Republic, competed at the 2016 Summer Olympics in Rio de Janeiro, Brazil, from 5 to 21 August 2016. This was the nation's ninth appearance at the Summer Olympics, having attended all games since 1980 with the exception of the 1984 Summer Olympics in Los Angeles, because of the Soviet boycott.

Six athletes, four men and two women, were selected to the Laotian team through universality places and Tripartite Commission invitations across four sports, without having qualified. Apart from athletics and swimming, Laos marked its Olympic debut in road cycling and judo. Among the Laotian athletes were London 2012 Olympians Laenly Phoutthavong (women's 100 m) in track and field and Santisouk Inthavong (men's 50 m freestyle) in swimming, professional road cyclist Ariya Phounsavath, and hurdler Xaysa Anousone, who led the delegation as the nation's flag bearer in the opening ceremony. Laos has yet to win its first Olympic medal.

Athletics

Laos has received universality slots from IAAF to send two athletes (one male and one female) to the Olympics.

Track & road events

Cycling

Road
Laos has received an invitation from the Tripartite Commission to send a rider competing in the men's road race for the first time to the Olympics.

Judo
 
Laos has received an invitation from the Tripartite Commission to send a judoka competing in the men's extra-lightweight category (60 kg) to the Olympics, signifying the nation's Olympic debut in the sport.

Swimming

Laos has received a Universality invitation from FINA to send two swimmers (one male and one female) to the Olympics.

References

External links 

 
 

Olympics
2016
Nations at the 2016 Summer Olympics